Belaturricula gaini is a species of sea snail, a marine gastropod mollusk in the family Borsoniidae.

Description
The shell grows to a length of 73 mm.

Distribution
This marine species occurs off the South Shetlands, the Scotia Sea, the Ross Sea and the Antarctic Ocean; also off the South Orkneys and the South Shetlands.

References

 Lamy, E., 1910a. Mission dans l'Antarctique dirigée par M. le Dr. Charcot (1908–1910); Collections recueillies par M. le Dr. J. Liouville. Gastropodes Prosobranches et Scaphopodes. Bulletin du Museum National d'Histoire Naturelle, 16: 318–324. 
  Bouchet P., Kantor Yu.I., Sysoev A. & Puillandre N. (2011) A new operational classification of the Conoidea. Journal of Molluscan Studies 77: 273–308. 
 Kantor, Yuri I., and M. G. Harasewych. "Rediscovery of the Antarctic species Sipho gaini Lamy, 1910 (Gastropoda: Neogastropoda) with remarks on its taxonomic position." Antarctic Science 11.04 (1999): 430–435.
 Troncoso, Jesús S., et al. "Quantitative analysis of soft‐bottom molluscs in the Bellingshausen Sea and around Peter I Island." Polar Research 26.2 (2007): 126–134
 Kantor, Yuri I., Myroslaw G. Harasewych, and Nicolas Puillandre. "A critical review of Antarctic Conoidea (Neogastropoda)." Molluscan Research 36.3 (2016): 153–206.

External links
 Antarctic Invertebrates : Belaturricula gaini; accessed: 13 August 2011
 
  Aldea & Troncoso: Systematics and distribution of shelled molluscs (Gastropoda, Bivalvia and Scaphopoda) from the South Shetlands to the Bellinghausen Sea, West Antarctica; Iberus : revista de la Sociedad Española de Malacología v.26 (2008)

gaini
Gastropods described in 1910